Wirkus is a surname from Lithuanian meaning "to cry", or from Polish meaning "top". Notable people with the surname include:

Emma Wirkus (born 1982), Australian soccer player
Faustin E. Wirkus (1896–1945), American soldier

References

Lithuanian-language surnames
Polish-language surnames